Ma'agan Michael (lit. Michael's Anchorage) is a kibbutz in northern Israel. Located on the Mediterranean Sea coast between Haifa and Hadera, it falls under the jurisdiction of Hof HaCarmel Regional Council.

Ma'agan Michael is among Israel's largest and financially independent kibbutzim.

History

Kabara concession and depopulation
The area was previously known as Kabara, or Zor al-Zarqa (the latter referring to the Zarqa River). The land was mostly rocky, hilly, and marshland, and was regarded by the Mandate government as Mawat by the Ottoman Land Code of 1858. A government concession was leased to Palestine Jewish Colonization Association (PICA) in 1921.

The two groups which sedentarized the area, 'Arab al-Ghawarneh' and 'Arab Kabbara', comprised 79 families and 13 families respectively in the 1920s; the mandate government concluded that although state lands which were occupied by Palestinians could not be allocated for Jewish settlement, this area would be made an exception.

Throughout the mandate the British authorities and PICA attempted to enter into settlements with the local population, and subsequently to remove them from the land. The area was not depopulated of its Palestinian residents until the 1948 Palestine war.

Foundation
Ma'agan Michael was founded on 25 August 1949 by a group consisting of 154 members and 44 children who had joined together in 1942, most of whom were members of the Hebrew Scouts. It was named for Michael Pollack, founder of the Nesher cement plant.

The group was originally based in a temporary Jewish Agency camp in Pardes Hanna, where they learned the skills needed to create an independent settlement, including how to manage citrus groves, cows, sheep, and chickens.

The initial group was joined by a larger group of younger immigrants without their parents from Germany and Austria (Youth Aliyah), and were undergoing preparatory training at Ein Gev. The group stayed in Pardess Hanna until the end of World War II, while several members were sent abroad as emissaries; others joined the Jewish Brigade, the Palmach, worked in other kibbutzim, in the Dead Sea Works at Sdom, or in the newly established Military Industries.

In 1946 the HQ Staff of the Haganah relocated the group to a temporary settlement in Rehovot, which later was known as “Kibbutz Hill”.  This settlement was to serve as cover for a secret underground factory to manufacture 9mm ammunition for Sten submachine guns. During this period the kibbutz members lived a double life to keep information of the illicit arms factory from the British Mandate Forces. In 1948 the factory was moved to the newly founded Military Industries (TAAS).  The site at Kibbutz Hill in Rehovot is currently preserved as the Ayalon Museum. The first members began settling the present site, erecting the first buildings which consisted of wooden huts prepared by carpenters in Rehovot.

In the early years the kibbutz took in many disadvantaged youngsters and youth groups (youth aliyah). An ulpan was opened, and many ulpan graduates later joined the ranks of the kibbutz membership. The ulpan became popular and successful, and has completed more than 100 5-month-long courses with thousands of graduates.

Most of the agricultural land of the kibbutz was reclaimed from the Kabarra swampland, which was drained in the 1920s with money from Baron Rothschild, and labor of Jewish pioneers and local Bedouin residents. A small area remains swamplike and is used as pasture for horses and as a nature reserve.

Later history
The kibbutz engaged in internal talks regarding the desire for change based on providing the members with a greater choice in their decisions and their budgets, greater privatization, and less dependence on others. They adopted a decision regarding the dining room and increasing options by paying for food. All these changes are being approached slowly and deliberately to try to preserve the kibbutz's communal values.

The kibbutz has become the largest kibbutz in Israel with a population of 1,412, consisting of 791 members and candidates for membership, 383 children, plus non-member residents, soldiers, and ulpanists.

On 11 March 1978, eleven Palestinian militants landed in Zodiac boats on a beach just outside Ma'agan Michael and from there ventured towards Tel Aviv in a hijacked bus in what has become known as the Coastal Road massacre where 38 Israelis were killed. First, however, the terrorists shot and killed American nature photographer Gail Rubin, who was photographing wildlife on the beach at the kibbutz for a book.

Geography

The kibbutz is located 30 km south of Haifa and 70 km north of Tel Aviv and lies near the edge of the Mediterranean Sea west of Mount Carmel, south of bordering kibbutz Ma'ayan Zvi, and north of the Taninim Stream. It is north of an Arab village, Jisr az-Zarqa.

The original site was a windswept, treeless sandstone (Eolianite) hill. Some of this land was reclaimed from Kabarra swamp. The nearby Timsah Springs, which originates from the Taninim Stream, is one of the local sources of brackish water for the kibbutz' numerous fishponds, which total 1,600 dunams (1.6 km²) in surface area. The Nahal Taninim nature reserve lies south of the kibbutz and is the site of an ancient Roman dam and aqueduct, which have been restored by the Department of Antiquities, the Drainage Authorities, and Nature and Parks Authorities.

Demographics
Together with the Israel-born members, the kibbutz membership has a heterogeneity of origins. It has absorbed members with origins from all over the world. Many members came from Arab countries (Iraq, Tunisia, Morocco).

Economy
Ma'agan Michael's agricultural endeavors includes field crops and orchards. Field crops are grown on 1600 dunams (1.6 km²) of the Kabarra. Fodder is grown for the dairy cows. For many years the main crop has been cotton. Several varieties of avocado (1,000 dunams) are grown, especially in orchards in Tantura, most of which is exported to Europe. The kibbutz produces 1,200 tons of bananas per year, solely for the local market. Papaya and other exotic fruits are grown in 40 dunams in greenhouses (organic crop), with over 80 types of fruit trees (Abraham's Orchard) on Mount Carmel.

The kibbutz produces 2,000 tons of poultry per year, using free-range intensive breeding. The chick hatchery produces about 4.5 million day-old chicks per year. There is a dairy herd with about 300 cows and 200 calves, which produces over 3.2 million liters of milk per year.

MADAN is the Aquaculture Fish farming branch of kibbutz Ma’agan Michael agriculture enterprises.  The aquaculture branches include about 1600 dunams of fishponds, where edible fish such as carp, gray mullet, St. Peter's fish and silver carp are raised. There is also an area for intensive fish production in concrete ponds, which are used to raise almost 300 tons of striped bass, Musar, Lavrak. The kibbutz sells over 1,000 tons of edible fish per year. The kibbutz also raises seafish, as well as decorative fish for ponds and aquaria, such as Koi and goldfish.

Since 1958 Ma'agan Michael has run two ulpans per year. The ulpan is a central part of the identity of Ma'agan Michael.  Over 25% of the members of the kibbutz are graduates.

Plasson is the kibbutz's plastics factory. It was founded in 1963 and is the main source of income and employment for the kibbutz. Annual sales reach about $100 million, with some 85% of the products exported worldwide. The main Plasson factory at Ma'agan Michael employs over 400 workers, half of them members of the kibbutz.  About 200 more workers are employed in subsidiaries around the world. Plasson is a leader in polyethylene pipe-fittings, poultry drinker systems, and is a large producer of toilet-flushing systems, mainly for the local market. The company has full ownership of six marketing companies abroad and holds  part ownership in several others. Plasson also holds full or part ownership of 6 production companies in Israel and abroad. In 1997, 20% of Plasson was floated as stocks on the Tel Aviv stockmarket.  The public company is called Plasson Industries, Inc.  In April 2000 a strategic partner, the Swiss company George Fischer, acquired for 20%.

Suron is a factory established by the kibbutz to produce precise metal parts using photochemical etching and electroforming, and also metal plating in gold and nickel. The precision metal parts produced by Suron are used in an industrial products and are used in industries involved in electronics, microelectronics, electro-optics, precise mechanics, electronic circuits and medical products. Suron also provides technical photographic service for “high-tech” industries.

Notable people

 Yohai Ben-Nun (1924–1994), sixth commander of the Israeli Navy
 Eliezer Rafaeli (1926–2018), founding President of the University of Haifa
 Meir Zorea (1923–1995), member of the ninth Knesset
 Janet Reger (1935-2005), British lingerie designer

See also
Ma'agan Michael Ship
Walk on Water (film)

References

External links
Kibbutz website
Ma'agan Michael Agro Center
Yugoslav refugees head for Israel Jewish News of Greater Phoenix, 16 April 1999
English team playing football in Ma'agan Michael
Kibbutz Ma'agan Michael Collection on the Digital collections of Younes and Soraya Nazarian Library, University of Haifa

Kibbutzim
Kibbutz Movement
Populated places established in 1949
1949 establishments in Israel
Archaeological sites in Israel
Populated places in Haifa District